European route E 961 is a European B class road in Greece, connecting the city Tripoli – Gytheio.

Route 
 
 E65 Tripoli
 Sparti
 Gytheio

References

External links 
 UN Economic Commission for Europe: Overall Map of E-road Network (2007)
 International E-road network

International E-road network
Roads in Greece